The Wiyot are a Native American people of California.

Wiyot may also refer to:
Wiyot language
Wiyot Tribe, a federally recognized Wiyot group
Wiyot, or Weywot, a figure of Tongva mythology